Xie Feng (born 9 April 1966) is a Chinese former footballer and a manager.

Club career
Xie’s father, Xie Hongjun, is a retired footballer who played for Shanghai Team and the Chinese national team. His mother Zheng Yuru was a sprinter active in the 1950s. Xie Hongjun would move into coaching with the Beijing Youth Team while Xie Feng would progress through the organisation into the senior team by 1988. Initially when Xie Feng started his career at Beijing FC (later renamed Beijing Guoan), he was a striker whose his ability to run 100 metres in 11 seconds was considered a great asset. His speed would be highlighted when he scored against both A.C. Milan and Arsenal in friendlies for Beijing Guoan in 1994 and 1995 respectively.

Xie would be converted to a right-back by head coach Jin Zhiyang to accommodate the striker Gao Hongbo. The move would be a huge success for Xie and he would go on to win the 1996 and 1997 Chinese FA Cup with the club. After spending his whole career in Beijing, Xie joined another top tier club in Shenzhen Pingan where he remained until at the end of the 2001 league season where he spent the whole campaign recovering from injury before deciding to retire from playing and take the advice of the club's Head Zhu Guanghu and move into coaching.

Management career
After retiring as a player at Shenzhen Pingan, Xie assumed the position of assistant manager at the club, temporarily being named interim manager on two separate occasions. 

In the 2010 Chinese Super League season, Xie was named assistant manager of Shaanxi Chanba. 

On 19 May 2016, Alberto Zaccheroni was sacked as Beijing Guoan manager, with Xie being appointed interim manager until a replacement was hired. 

On 15 May 2019, following the sacking of Chris Coleman, Hebei China Fortune announced that Xie would manage the club on an interim basis.  

On 14 January 2022, Xie was named as the head coach of Beijing Guoan. On 12 August 2022, Xie resigned.

Honours

Player
Beijing Guoan
Jia B League: 1990
Chinese FA Cup: 1996, 1997

References

1966 births
Living people
Chinese footballers
Chinese football managers
Footballers from Shanghai
Beijing Guoan F.C. players
Beijing Guoan F.C. managers
Shenzhen F.C. players
Hebei F.C. managers
Chinese Super League managers
China international footballers
Association football defenders
Association football forwards
Beijing Guoan F.C. non-playing staff